Extremadura is a Spanish geographical indication for Vino de la Tierra wines located in the autonomous region of Extremadura. Vino de la Tierra is one step below the mainstream Denominación de Origen indication on the Spanish wine quality ladder.

The area covered by this geographical indication comprises all the municipalities in Extremadura.

It acquired its Vino de la Tierra status in 1999.

Grape varieties
Red: Bobal, Mazuela, Monastrell, Tempranillo, Garnacha, Graciano, Merlot, Syrah and Cabernet Sauvignon.
White: Alarije, Borba, Cayetana Blanca, Chardonnay, Chelva, Malvar, Viura, Parellada, Pedro Ximénez and Verdejo.

References

Spanish wine
Wine regions of Spain
Wine-related lists
Appellations